Merel Smulders (born 23 January 1998 in Horssen) is a Dutch BMX rider.

Career
She was the silver medal winner at the 2018 UCI BMX World Championships behind her sister Laura Smulders.  Prior to this became junior World Time Trial Champion at the 2016 UCI BMX World Championships. At the 2020 Summer Games BMX Race she won the bronze medal.

Personal life
She is the younger sister of Laura Smulders, who won bronze in BMX at the 2012 Olympics.

References

External links
 
 
 
 
 
 

Living people
1998 births
BMX riders
Dutch female cyclists
Olympic cyclists of the Netherlands
Olympic medalists in cycling
Olympic bronze medalists for the Netherlands
Cyclists at the 2020 Summer Olympics
Medalists at the 2020 Summer Olympics
Cyclists from Gelderland
Sportspeople from Nijmegen
21st-century Dutch women